Jonny Forsström (1944–2017) was a Swedish picture artist, sculptor, and filmmaker. He is best known for his colorful and humorous pencil and mixed-media works.

Early life 
Jonny Forsström was born in Stora Möckleby, Öland, Sweden, but he grew up in the mining town Malmberget, Lapland, Sweden. After leaving his parents, he moved to Alingsås and later to Trollhättan.

Forsström was prescribed eyeglasses at age six, which he later described as a sure sign of weakness in the 1950s that would rule out soccer and other typical physical children's play. However, Forsström explained that because glasses allowed him to see clearly, he became a by-standing voyeur, able to take particular note of people's gestures.

He had a variety of jobs after his school years; he worked as a sailor, shipyard worker, and in the hotel business in Gothenburg and Stockholm. Forsström described his discovery of art as having given him hope and a new sense of freedom.

Exhibitions 
 1990 Parafras Piero della Francesca, Konsthallen Trollhättan, Sweden
 2006 Konsthallen Trollhättan, Sweden. Various oil, sketches, aquarelle and sculpture.

Galleries exhibiting/represented 
 Gabrielle Bryers Gallery, New York, USA
 Northern Light Ltd. California, USA
 Galerie Studio Four, London, England
 Gallerie Bleu, Paris, France
 Galerie Peuples et Continents, Bryssel, Belgium
 Art 76, Basel, Switzerland
 Galleri Otenti, Antwerp, Holland
 Galeri Arnesen, Copenhagen, Denmark
 Art Now Gallery, Gothenburg, Sweden

References 

1944 births
Swedish artists
2017 deaths